Levice (literally lionesses) is a town in western Slovakia. The town lies on the left bank of the lower Hron river. The Old Slavic name of the town was Leva, which means "the Left One".

The town's heraldic animal is lion (in Slovak lev), and the town's colours are green and yellow.

History

Levice is first mentioned as Leua, one of the villages belonging to the parish of St. Martin's Church in Bratka in 1156. It was part of the comitatus Tekov (Bars).

First attacked by the Turks in 1544, the town was set on fire while the castle was left unharmed.  Between 1581 and 1589, the settlement was the seat of the Captaincy of Lower Hungary. The town was captured by the Turks in 1663 but recaptured only a year later by the Imperial Army led by General de Souches in the Battle of Levice, which took place beneath the town's castle. 

During the anti-Habsburg revolution of 1709, the fort was blown up by kuruces.
After the break-up of Austria-Hungary, the town became a part of Czechoslovakia (confirmed by the Treaty of Trianon in 1920). As part of the breakup of Czechoslovakia under the Munich Agreement in World War II, the town again belonged to Hungary from 1938 to 1945. At the end of the Second World War it was returned to the restored Czechoslovakia. In 1993 it became part of present-day Slovakia.

It was the hometown of Hungarian-American Eugene Fodor (1905–1991), the founder of Fodor's travel book company.

Demographics
Census 2011:      34.844 inhabitants (100%)

Ethnicity 
Slovak         25.549 (73,3%)
Hungarian       2.927 ( 8,4%)
 others                     6.368 (18,3%)

Religious makeup
Roman Catholic (majority), Reformed Protestant (Calvinist), Moravian Brethren (the biggest congregation in Slovakia), Lutheran, Baptist, Old Catholic Church, Adventist of the 7th Day, Modrý kríž (Blue Cross), several Charismatic and Pentecostal communities, Jehovah's Witnesses, Muslim community (non-practising), Jewish community (non-practising), atheists

Economy

Production

Textiles, cosmetics, furniture, products from locally obtained Golden Onyx, machinery and construction components, cereals, meat, eggs, dairy products, soft drinks, malt, wine (Levická frankovka is a trademark for locally produced red-wine).

Education
There are 8 elementary schools (7 secular including 1 Hungarian, and 1 Roman Catholic school), Gymnazium Andreja Vrabla, a general High School, a Hungarian Calvinist High School (Lyceum), a Business Academy, a Pedagogical and Social Academy, a Secondary Technical School, a Secondary Agricultural School and various apprentice schools.

Main sights
The Castle, built in a Gothic style as a trade-route guarding fort at the end of 13th century.
Dobo Château, built by István Dobó, a hero of the siege of Eger, in the 1560s.

Places of worship

St Joseph's Church, Roman Catholic, accompanied by a baroque Franciscan convent. It is found close to the entrance to the château, and dates from the turn of the 18th century.
St Michael's Church – Roman Catholic, found in St Michael's street (Sv. Michala). It is from the 2nd half of the 18th century
Church of the Holy Spirit – Roman Catholic, in the Rybniky quarter. It is from the start of the 21st century
Chapel of St Urban – Roman Catholic, F. Hecku street, 1770s
Evanjelický a. v. kostol – Lutheran,  street, 1840s to 1930s
Zborový dom (Congregational House) – Lutheran, next to the latter
Kostol Reformovanej cirkvi – Calvinist, Sv. Michala street, end of 18th century
Zborový dom (Congregational House) – Brethren Church, S. Chalupku street, 1983–85
Synagogue – Jewish, K. Kittenberger street, half of 19th century

Other sights
Schoeller's Mill – built at the end of the 19th century, production was cancelled in 1998, rebuilt into a complex of luxury shops, offices, dwellings and entertainment facilities.
Main square – a good collection of Art-Nouveau and eclectic buildings.
Town hall – erected in 1902, second floor built-up while lifting the roof by a screw mechanism in 1927.
Teachers Academy – secondary school, E point of the Kalvaria hill, N of the main square, built in 1911 as a mix of the late Art-Nouveau and Italian trecento-influenced historism.

Functionalist architectures
District Court Building – corner of Mlynska and Zahradna streets, projected by Milan Michal Harminc
Fried's House – corner of L. Stura and Sv. Michala streets
Strasser's House – Sturova street, next to the Fried's House
Fertsek Brothers House – corner of Soltesova square and  street
Munk's House – corner of Mlynska and Zahradna streets
Reitmann's House – Mlynska street, a passage to I. Krasku street
Eisler's House – corner of Mlynska and L. Stura streets
Police District Headquarters Building – former Seat of District Authority, crossing of Kalvinske square and Sv. Michala street
Health Insurance Company Building – M. R. Stefanik street, later Infant Hospital

Nearby places of interest
 
Horšianska Dolina (Horša Valley) – nature preserve with unique plant and animal endemics, folk architecture in Horša
Kalinčiakovo – this village has a tiny but well preserved Romanesque church dating from the 12th century (see Romanesque church in Kalinčiakovo) and the swimming pool of Margita-Ilona
Hronský Beňadik – medieval fort-monastery with Gothic entrance, tombs and memorabilia of Hungarian noblemen
Želiezovce– Neoclassical residence of Count Eszterhazy, and Soví zámoček (Owl Château) where the Austrian composer Franz Schubert taught music
Santovka– mineral water springs and swimming pool
Brhlovce– cave-like dwellings cut into volcanic rock, nominated as a UNESCO World Heritage site
Čajkov– known for local folk costumes and the annual wine harvest festival
Pukanec– tiny mining town once enjoying the status of Free royal town, still known for hand-made pottery
Sitno– volcanic peak in the Štiavnica Mountains, Celtic funeral place, medieval castle ruins, and a botanic nature reserve featuring rare rose species

Notable people
Levice is the birthplace of the geographer Kálmán Kittenberger (1881–1958).  and of the Hungarian composer and pianist Pál Kadosa

Twin towns — sister cities

Levice is twinned with:

 Boskovice, Czech Republic
 Érd, Hungary
 Náměšť na Hané, Czech Republic
 Ruda Śląska, Poland
 Skierniewice, Poland

References

External links
 Official town web site
 Map of Levice
 Portál Leviceonline.sk – regionálny internetový portál pre Levice a okolie
 Levické internetové noviny Levičan.sk
 MestoLevice.sk – online katalóg firiem

Cities and towns in Slovakia